The Tennessee, Alabama and Georgia 101 is a historic steam locomotive located near the Cotten Belt Railroad Depot in downtown Fordyce, Arkansas.  It is the last known steam locomotive associated with the Fordyce and Princeton Railroad.  It was built in 1922 by the Baldwin Locomotive Works of Philadelphia, Pennsylvania, for the Tennessee, Alabama and Georgia Railway.  It was sold to the Fordyce and Princeton in 1931, and retired in 1948.  Given to the city of Little Rock, it was displayed at the Little Rock Zoo for twenty years, and was moved to Fordyce in 2007.

See also
National Register of Historic Places listings in Dallas County, Arkansas

References

Railway locomotives on the National Register of Historic Places in Arkansas
Buildings and structures in Fordyce, Arkansas
Steam locomotives of the United States
National Register of Historic Places in Dallas County, Arkansas
Historic district contributing properties in Arkansas
2-8-0 locomotives
Baldwin locomotives
Railway locomotives introduced in 1922
Standard gauge locomotives of the United States

Preserved steam locomotives of Arkansas